The Women's slalom competition of the Lillehammer 1994 Olympics was held at Hafjell on Saturday, February 26.

The defending world champion was Karin Buder of Austria, while Switzerland's Vreni Schneider was the defending World Cup slalom champion and led the current season. Defending Olympic champion Petra Kronberger had retired over a year earlier.

Schneider won the gold medal, Elfi Eder of Austria took the silver, and the bronze medalist was Katja Koren of Slovenia.

Results

References 

Women's slalom
Alp
Olymp